Darreh Badam-e Olya (also Romanized as Darreh Bādām-e ‘Olyā and Darreh Bādām Olyā; also known as Darreh Bādām and Darreh Bādām-e Bālā) is a village in Pishkuh-e Mugui Rural District, in the Central District of Fereydunshahr County, Isfahan Province, Iran. At the 2006 census, its population was 145, in 27 families.

References 

Populated places in Fereydunshahr County